Kentucky is currently divided into 6 congressional districts, each represented by a member of the United States House of Representatives. The number of congressional districts has been set at 6 since the 1990 redistricting cycle.

Current districts and representatives
This is a list of members of the current Kentuckian House delegation, their terms, their district boundaries, and the district political ratings according to the Cook Partisan Voting Index (CPVI). The delegation has a total of six members, including five Republicans and one Democrat.

Historical and present district boundaries
Table of United States congressional district boundary maps in the State of Kentucky, presented chronologically. All redistricting events that took place in Kentucky between 1973 and 2013 are shown.

Obsolete districts
The following are former districts of Kentucky:
, obsolete since the 1990 census
, obsolete since the 1960 census
, obsolete since the 1950 census
, obsolete since the 1930 census
, obsolete since the 1930 census
, obsolete since the 1840 census
, obsolete since the 1840 census
, obsolete since 1935

See also

List of United States congressional districts

References

Politics of Kentucky